Kentuckia is an extinct genus of prehistoric bony fish.

Taxonomy
 Family Kentuckiidae Gardiner 1993
 Genus Kentuckia Rayner 1951
 K. deani (Eastman 1907) [Rhadinichthys deani Eastman 1907]
 K. hlavini Dunkle 1964

See also

 Prehistoric fish
 List of prehistoric bony fish

References

Palaeonisciformes